Fernand Paillet (1850–1918) was a French figurine artist, miniature portraitist and jewelry designer. He painted many American socialites of the Gilded Age.

Early life
Fernand Paillet was born in 1850 in Niort, France. He was trained by Albert-Ernest Carrier-Belleuse.

Career

Paillet established a studio in Paris. He became renowned for his figurines, made with ivory and ceramic.

He painted portraits of American socialites of the Gilded Age, including miniatures for the Peter Marié collection, now preserved by the New-York Historical Society. He did a miniature portrait of Edith Wharton.

Paillet also designed jewelry. A pendant he designed for Marcus & Co., a luxury jewelry retailer, is exhibited at the Walters Art Museum in Baltimore, Maryland.

Death
He died in 1918.

References

External links
 

1850 births
1918 deaths
People from Niort
Painters from Paris
19th-century French painters
French male painters
20th-century French painters
20th-century French male artists
19th-century French male artists